Mateo Ramírez Montenegro (born 18 January 1995) is an Argentine professional footballer who plays as a midfielder for Los Andes.

Career
Ramírez had a stint in the youth system of Vélez Sarsfield. Primera B Nacional's Boca Unidos signed Ramírez ahead of the 2016 campaign. Having been an unused substitute for a match with Brown, the midfielder played the second half of a home defeat to Guillermo Brown on 28 February 2016. His first start came in 2016–17 versus All Boys, which preceded a total of twenty-five appearances that campaign. On 23 August 2017, Ramírez joined Gimnasia y Esgrima of Torneo Federal A. He netted against Deportivo Maipú and Juventud Unida Universitario in season one, on the way to promotion to the tier two for 2018–19.

Career statistics
.

References

External links

1995 births
Living people
Sportspeople from Buenos Aires Province
Argentine footballers
Association football midfielders
Primera Nacional players
Torneo Federal A players
Boca Unidos footballers
Gimnasia y Esgrima de Mendoza footballers
Guillermo Brown footballers
Club Atlético Fénix players
Asociación Social y Deportiva Justo José de Urquiza players
Club Atlético Los Andes footballers